T.A.S Menon is former principal of the Raja Ravi Varma College of Fine Arts Mavelikara, Kerala, India. He is a former executive member of the Kerala Lalita Kala Akademi, former jury member of the Raja Ravi Varma Award, former executive member of the Kerala Kalamandalam, Examination board chief of the institute of Mural painting (Mammiyur Krishnan Kutty Nair Smarakam), and a patron of the Narendra Prasad foundation.

See also
 Raja Ravi Varma College of Fine Arts
 Kerala Lalita Kala Akademi
 Kerala Kalamandalam

References

External links
 
 

Indian contemporary painters
Living people
20th-century Indian painters
Malayali people
Raja Ravi Varma College of Fine Arts alumni
Painters from Kerala
Artists from Kochi
Indian male painters
Year of birth missing (living people)
20th-century Indian male artists
21st-century Indian male artists